Baggettsville is an unincorporated community in Robertson County, Tennessee, in the United States.

History
A post office was established at Baggettsville in 1870, and remained in operation until it was discontinued in 1907. Archer B. Baggett served as postmaster there.

References

Unincorporated communities in Robertson County, Tennessee
Unincorporated communities in Tennessee